Ledermanniella is a genus of flowering plants in the family Podostemaceae. There are at least 44 species all native to tropical Africa.

The genus name of Ledermanniella is in honour of Carl Ludwig Ledermann (1875-1958), who was a Swiss botanist and horticultural expert.

The genus was circumscribed by Heinrich Gustav Adolf Engler in Bot. Jahrb. Syst. vol.43 (Issue 4) on page 378 in 1909.

Species include:
 Ledermanniella keayi (G.Taylor) C.Cusset
 Ledermanniella letouzeyi C.Cusset
 Ledermanniella onanae Cheek
 Ledermanniella thalloidea (Engl.) C.Cusset

References

 
Malpighiales genera
Taxonomy articles created by Polbot